Maryville is the name of several places.

In the United States:

 Maryville, Tennessee
 Maryville, Missouri
 Maryville, Illinois
 Maryville, an alternate name for Porterville, Mississippi
 Maryville College in Maryville, Tennessee
 Maryville University in St. Louis, Missouri
 Maryville, 1865 settlement within Mesa, Arizona

In Australia:
 Maryville, New South Wales

In Pakistan:
 Maryville, property in Karachi, Pakistan that was owned by Frank D'Souza, the first Indian board member of British Indian Railways.

In Scotland:
 Maryville, a hamlet and major motorway interchange (M73 / M74) in South Lanarkshire

See also 

 Marysville (disambiguation)
 
 Ville (disambiguation)
 Mary (disambiguation)
 Ville-Marie (disambiguation)
 Villa Maria (disambiguation)
 Vila Maria (disambiguation)
 Marystown (disambiguation)
 Marytown (disambiguation)